Frances Wetherall (born 3 February 1952) is a British sprint canoer who competed in the early 1980s. At the 1980 Summer Olympics in Moscow, she finished eighth in the K-2 500 m event.

References

EDUCATION
She was educated at St. Michael's catholic grammar school in north Finchley, London.

1952 births
Canoeists at the 1980 Summer Olympics
Living people
Olympic canoeists of Great Britain
British female canoeists